is a Japanese manga series written and illustrated by Amyu. The series began publication in Shueisha's Jump Square magazine in August 2012. It has been reported that over 5.5 million copies of the manga have been sold. An anime television series adaptation by Platinum Vision aired from April to December 2019.

Plot
The story focuses on the Koto club of the Tokise High School in Kanagawa Prefecture. Takezo Kurata, in his second year, is the only member left in the Koto club, after all the senior members have graduated. While he is trying his best to recruit more members into the club, Chika Kudo submits his application. But, since Kudo is known to be a delinquent, one who destroyed his own grandfather's koto shop, Takezo is apprehensive about him. Things change when he discovers the truth. Also joining the club is the Koto prodigy, Satowa Hozuki, who has her own agenda. More members join the club in time, holding their own reasons for joining. However, in the end, they all have the same goal - to play at the Koto Nationals competition.

Characters

 (anime)
Kudo, fondly called by his first name by most of his friends, has a very childish personality. He is straightforward with his words, but doesn't clearly know how to express himself or understand others, since he hasn't had many friends, spending most of his younger years being a delinquent. He changes his attitude because of his grandfather, and develops an interest towards the Koto because of him. He likes to help out his friends, but becomes shy when they thank him.
Although he starts with basically no knowledge about the Koto, he is able to learn playing pretty quickly. He even has the ability to learn to play right after seeing someone else (for example, Satowa) playing it a few times. After learning that Satowa is a genius, he makes reaching her level (as a rival) his goal. He later develops a crush on her but does not understand his own feelings, leading to him wondering why he feels the urge to touch or embrace her. He has an earnest and diligent attitude when playing the Koto and it seems to flow into his music too.
Chika currently stays with his aunt, Isaki. The one who understands him the most is his friend, Takaoka.

 (anime)
The president of the Koto club; settling into the role since there are no other senior members left after all his seniors graduated. He is also relatively new to the Koto, and initially feels the pressure of being the president, but calms down once he knows that he has the help and support from all the other members of the club.
Initially, his personality was like that of a coward, and someone who lacked confidence, no matter what he did. This changes later, and he becomes quite the dependable senior and president. Mostly, he has a serious personality, and approaches everything he does earnestly.
He has a crush on Kurusu, who reciprocates the feeling, even though they have not confessed to each other, being completely unaware of the other's feelings.

 (anime)
A prodigious Koto player. Initially, she shows off a stuck up attitude, but very easily settles down and becomes an integral part of the Koto club. Since the other members have practically no professional knowledge of the Koto, she becomes somewhat of a teacher to them. This role is subdued after Doujima starts teaching her.
As a professional player, Satowa can play almost any of the types of Koto easily. A hard worker by nature, she tries to understand the 'meaning' of the song to understand its nature, to play it better. Although she started teaching the other members of the club, she herself admits that teaching is not her thing. She sometimes becomes unable to teach/explain concepts because playing comes most naturally to her, and she finds explaining/correcting difficult.
When she started at Tokise, she was already estranged from her mother and the Hōzuki group. Estranged from her mother, who was losing herself under the stress of managing the Hōzuki group, Satowa tried to call out for her through her music. But this ended up in her excommunication from the group and abandonment by her mother. This breaks Satowa's heart. However, later, with everyone's support she is able to make amends with her mother after she watches her performance at the National Preliminaries. She is also officially reinstated as the heir of the Hōzuki group.
She later has a crush on Kudo, but tries hard not to show or acknowledge it.

Kurusu is in the same grade and class as Kurata who, along with the whole Tokise High School, watches the Koto Club's morning assembly performance. After the performance, Kurusu approaches Takezo Kurata who is in the same class as her, and expresses her intent to join their club, in which he accepts her application and introduces her to the club. She later becomes the vice-president of the Koto club after witnessing the burden that Kurata has to bear as president.

Kudo's friend from before the series started. He is good at studying, cooking and at fighting too. He is the one who understands Kudo the most. He also explained Kudo's situation to Takezo when he wanted to join the Koto club. Kudo hangs out at his place, even when he is feeling off, making him feed him. He also ends up being Kudo and his other friends' cram teacher when exams are due.

A former delinquent.

A former delinquent.

A former delinquent.

A math teacher at Tokise High and the Koto Club's advisor. Initially he feigned ignorance of his musical background, though it is later revealed that his parents are world renowned musicians. As a child, he had no interest in playing music whatsoever other than listening to it. When he was seven, his father discovered his talent for writing musical scores and quickly took upon him to brand his son as a child prodigy. Because of this, Suzuka began to disdain music but his interest is rekindled after becoming the advisor for the Koto club. He often writes pieces for the club as well as gives practice advice, while leaving the actual koto-teaching to Akira.

 (Japanese); Lydia Mackay (English)

 (Japanese); Dani Chambers (English)

 (Japanese); Stephen Fu (English)

The apparent heir to the Tsubaki School. She became the heir after the death of her parents, causing her older brother to drop out of college and attempt to find a job in order to support her and their grandmother. In her childhood, her brother was a renowned koto player and inspired Akira to pick it up. After her brother had also quit the koto, Akira was forced to become better at playing the koto and became the face of their group. For malicious reasons, she became Tokise High's koto instructor, but later officially took up the position after realizing the club's genuine intent to play the koto.

Media

Manga
Series is written and illustrated by Amyu and began publication in Shueisha's Jump Square magazine in August 2012. As of February 2023 It has been compiled into twenty-eight tankōbon volumes.

Volume List

Anime
An anime television series adaptation aired in two parts from April 6 to June 29, 2019 and October 5 to December 28, 2019 on Tokyo MX, BS11, AT-X, GYT, Wowow, and HTB. The series is animated by Platinum Vision and was directed by Ryōma Mizuno, with Ayumu Hisao handling series composition, and Junko Yamanaka designing the characters. Shouta Aoi performed the series' opening theme song "Tone", while Yuma Uchida performed the series' ending theme song "Speechless". Aoi also performed the series' second opening theme song "Harmony", while Uchida also performed the series' ending theme song "Rainbow". Funimation has licensed the series, and released the dub as it aired.

Stage play
A stage play adaptation ran in 2019 in three locations: August 17–25 in Tokyo, September 7–8 in Fukuoka, and September 14–15 in Osaka. The play starred Takuma Zaiki as Kudo, Kazuki Furuta as Kurata, Hinako Tanaka as Satowa, Kouhei Shiota as Adachi, Kotori Kojima as Sakai, and Tatsuki Jōnin as Mizuhara. In preparation for the play, the cast members trained for four months to learn how to play the koto.

Notes

References

External links
  
 

2019 anime television series debuts
Anime series based on manga
Funimation
Kanagawa Prefecture in fiction
Medialink
Music in anime and manga
Platinum Vision
Shōnen manga
Shueisha manga
Slice of life anime and manga
Tokyo MX original programming